Papuacalia is a genus of New Guinean flowering plants in the groundsel tribe within the sunflower family.

 Species<

References

Flora of New Guinea
Asteraceae genera
Senecioneae